The Vernonia School District is a public school district that serves students in the communities of Vernonia and Mist in the U.S. state of Oregon. Vernonia Elementary School, Vernonia Middle School, and Vernonia High School are contained in separate wings of a single building in Vernonia constructed on high ground after floods in 1996 and 2007 severely impacted the city. The new building was built above the floodplain to prevent future flooding.

Schools
Mist Elementary School
As of 2015, Mist Elementary served 16 students in grades K-5, in a 1917 school building with one teacher
Vernonia Elementary School
Vernonia Middle School
Vernonia High School

See also
Great Coastal Gale of 2007
Vernonia School District 47J v. Acton
Willamette Valley Flood of 1996

References

External links
Vernonia School District (official website)

Education in Columbia County, Oregon
School districts in Oregon